Johanns is a surname and given name of German origin, originating as a patronymic from the personal name Johann. Notable people with the surname or given name include:

Surname
Josef Johanns (born 1944), Luxembourgish racing cyclist
Mike Johanns (born 1950), American attorney and politician
Pierre Johanns (1882-1955), Luxembourgish Jesuit priest, missionary, and Indologist
Stephanie Johanns, American politician and businessperson

Given name
Johanns Dulcien (born 1991), Chilean former footballer

See also
Johann